Olli Immonen (born 12 February 1986) is a member of the Finnish Parliament for the Finns Party and a former chairman of the nationalist organization Suomen Sisu.

Immonen was born in Nivala, and received national attention in July 2015 after writing a controversial anti-multicultural text on his Facebook page.

References

1986 births
Living people
People from Nivala
Finns Party politicians
Members of the Parliament of Finland (2011–15)
Members of the Parliament of Finland (2015–19)
Members of the Parliament of Finland (2019–23)